Antonios Bougiouris (born 15 March 1974) is a Greek sailor. He competed in the Laser event at the 2000 Summer Olympics.

References

External links
 

1974 births
Living people
Greek male sailors (sport)
Olympic sailors of Greece
Sailors at the 2000 Summer Olympics – Laser
People from Ermoupoli
Sportspeople from the South Aegean